David Alan Drabold (born 13 February 1960) is an American physicist, currently Edwin and Ruth Kennedy Distinguished Professor at Ohio University.

Early life

Born in Akron, Ohio, he received a B.S. in applied mathematics from the University of Akron in 1982, and a PhD. in physics from Washington University in St. Louis.

Research

Drabold's work focuses on the theory of amorphous materials. He is known for his formulation of algorithms to elucidate consequences of structural disorder to electronic, optical and transport properties. His published research has over 10,000 scientific citations and has been published in high impact journals such as Nature and Science. He is a fellow of the American Physical Society, the Institute of Physics and the Royal Numismatic Society.

Selected publications

Origins of structural and electronic transitions in disordered silicon

Theory of diamondlike amorphous carbon

Energetics of Large Fullerenes: Balls, Tubes, and Capsules

References

External links 
 

1960 births
Living people
People from Akron, Ohio
21st-century American physicists
University of Akron alumni
Ohio University faculty
Washington University in St. Louis alumni
Washington University physicists
Fellows of the American Physical Society
Fellows of the Institute of Physics